Clemson Tigers Network is a subsidiary of Clemson Tigers Sports Properties and is the official media rights holder for Clemson University athletics. It is operated by JMI Sports, with distribution operations handled at WCCP-FM in Clemson, South Carolina. Prior to 2017, when the network was known as Clemson Tigers Sports Network, CTSN was operated by Learfield Sports.

Television

Coach's Show
CTSN produces a weekly coach's show for football and basketball. Hosted by Pete Yanity, the show reviews the past week's activity in each sport. The coach plays an active role on the show discussing the team's performance.

Radio
CTSN is available on a wide range of radio stations across the southeast, namely South Carolina. All Football and Men's Basketball games are also broadcast nationwide on XM Satellite Radio as well as Sirius Satellite Radio for those with the "Best of XM" package.

See also
Clemson University
Clemson Tigers

References

Clemson Tigers
Sports radio networks in the United States
College football on the radio
College basketball on the radio in the United States